Rotterdam Ahoy (formerly known as Ahoy Rotterdam or simply as Ahoy) is a convention centre and multi-purpose indoor arena located in Rotterdam, Netherlands. Opened originally in 1950, the current complex consists of three main venues: a fairs and event hall, a congress and conference centre, and the Ahoy Arena. The latter (informally known as the) opened on 15 January 1971 and is the largest venue, with a capacity of 16,426 as of April 2019.

Background and history

Original exhibition hall
The venue has a history dating back to 1950. After the devastation of World War II, Rotterdam city and harbor were rebuilt. In 1950, the harbor was almost finished, and the event was marked with the exhibition Rotterdam Ahoy!. The exhibition was held in a single hall that was built for the occasion and was located where the Erasmus MC in Rotterdam is today. The temporary exhibition hall was called Ahoy'-Hal and was used for both national and international events until 1966 when it was decided to demolish the hall. During the North Sea flood of 1953, the hall was also used as a shelter for flood victims. After 1966, temporary accommodation was found at Hofdijk/Pompenburg in the center of Rotterdam, on the site of a former heliport.

Current Ahoy complex

Construction work on the site of the present day complex began in 1968. The Sportpaleis, originally designed as an indoor velodrome, and three exhibition halls was completed in 1970. The official opening took place during Six Days of Rotterdam, a six-day track cycling race, and was performed by Prince Claus on 15 January 1971. However, the first fair already took place before the official opening, because in September 1970 Ahoy was the location for the Femina fair. The complex's striking design won various national and international awards. The design of the venue took inspiration from the water, with the building laid out like a ship.

Two further halls were added to the complex in 1980, however the rarely-used built-in cycling track was dismantled in 1988 following the cancellation of the race in order to increase the main arena's capacity for concerts. In 1998, the complex was expanded again to include a sixth event hall and a main reception hall (known as the plaza) designed by the architectural firm Benthem Crouwel. Offices, catering facilities as well as smaller conference and meeting rooms were built. The main entrance to the Sportpaleis was also redesigned and the concrete footbridge from the Zuidplein (which was connected to a shopping centre and metro station) demolished. The bridge was partly removed, so that it now ended at a staircase that led to the square in front of the reception hall. The demolition of the last section started on 3 March 2017, after the bridge had become unsafe due to a truck colliding with one of the bridge's girders earlier that week. In 2005, a (now removable) cycling track was built in Ahoy for the revived Six Days of Rotterdam racing event.

The main arena building was comprehensively modernised from October 2009 until the end of 2010 and reopened on 21 January 2011. The overall capacity was increased by 5,000 to more than 15,000 with a new grandstand and extra seats installed. In addition to the various interior work, Dutch lighting company Signify installed a new custom-made 1,000 m2 LED screen wall on the facade of the arena. Since April 2021, the complex has been equipped with 5,200 solar panels which supply large events with sustainable energy 195 days a year.

In July 2018, construction work began on an extension to the Ahoy complex. The new premises, featuring a dual-purpose 7,000-capacity concert hall and 2,750-seat auditorium/theatre (expandable to 4,000), adds an additional 35,000 square metres of floor space. On the 2nd and 3rd floors there are 35 break out rooms, varying in capacity from 50 to 1,000, that can be used separately or combined and a 2,300 m2 Expo Foyer which can be used for gala dinners, expos and receptions.

The artists' entrance to the main arena was renamed "Door Duncan" in 2020, in honor of Duncan Laurence (who was born in nearby Spijkenisse) who in 2019 brought the Netherlands its first victory in the Eurovision Song Contest since 1975.

Events

Sports

It has hosted sports competitions such as the Rotterdam Open and Six Days of Rotterdam every year and is one of the venues for Premier League Darts since 2016. Other international events held in the arena include:

1973 European Athletics Indoor Championships
1973 Ice Hockey World Championships
1989 FIFA Futsal World Championship
2009 World Judo Championships
2010 World Artistic Gymnastics Championships
2011 World Table Tennis Championships
2014 UCI BMX World Championships
2015 Women's European Volleyball Championship
2017 World Short Track Speed Skating Championships
2019 Men's European Volleyball Championship

It was a venue for the European finals of Superstars, the televised all-around sports competition from 1975 to 1977 and again in 1979.

In 2016, the venue hosted the mixed martial arts event UFC Fight Night: Overeem vs. Arlovski.

In 2017, the venue again hosted the UFC for UFC Fight Night: Volkov vs. Struve.

Music television

The 1997 and 2016 MTV Europe Music Awards and the Junior Eurovision Song Contest 2007 were also held in the Ahoy Arena. Rotterdam Ahoy was also planned to be the host venue for the Eurovision Song Contest 2020. It would have been the second venue to host both the junior and adult editions of the contest, after the Palace of Sports, Kyiv in Ukraine. On 18 March 2020, the EBU announced the cancellation of the contest due to the COVID-19 pandemic as the Dutch government requested that the arena would be utilised as a field hospital. Instead, Rotterdam Ahoy hosted the Eurovision Song Contest 2021 which took place on 18, 20 and 22 May 2021.

See also
 List of tennis stadiums by capacity
 List of convention centres in the Netherlands
 List of indoor arenas in the Netherlands

References

External links

 

Indoor arenas in the Netherlands
Tennis venues in the Netherlands
Velodromes in the Netherlands
Concert halls in the Netherlands
Convention centres in the Netherlands
Darts venues
Indoor track and field venues
Judo venues
Sports venues completed in 1971
1971 establishments in the Netherlands
Cycling in Rotterdam
Buildings and structures in Rotterdam
Sports venues in Rotterdam
20th-century architecture in the Netherlands